In mathematics, a polynomial lemniscate or polynomial level curve is a plane algebraic curve of degree 2n, constructed from a polynomial p with complex coefficients of degree n.

For any such polynomial p and positive real number c, we may define a set of complex numbers by  This set of numbers may be equated to points in the real Cartesian plane, leading to an algebraic curve ƒ(x, y) = c2 of degree 2n, which results from expanding out  in terms of z = x + iy.

When p is a polynomial of degree 1 then the resulting curve is simply a circle whose center is the zero of p. When p is a polynomial of degree 2 then the curve is a Cassini oval.

Erdős lemniscate 

A conjecture of Erdős which has attracted considerable interest concerns the maximum length of a polynomial lemniscate ƒ(x, y) = 1 of degree 2n when p is monic, which Erdős conjectured was attained when p(z) = zn − 1.
This is still not proved but Fryntov and Nazarov proved that p gives a
local maximum. In the case when n = 2, the Erdős lemniscate is the Lemniscate of Bernoulli

and it has been proven that this is indeed the maximal length in degree four. The Erdős lemniscate has three ordinary n-fold points, one of which is at the origin, and a genus of (n − 1)(n − 2)/2. By inverting the Erdős lemniscate in the unit circle, one obtains a nonsingular curve of degree n.

Generic polynomial lemniscate 

In general, a polynomial lemniscate will not touch at the origin, and will have only two ordinary n-fold singularities, and hence a genus of (n − 1)2. As a real curve, it can have a number of disconnected components. Hence, it will not look like a lemniscate, making the name something of a misnomer.

An interesting example of such polynomial lemniscates are the Mandelbrot curves.
If we set p0 = z, and pn = pn−12 + z, then the corresponding polynomial lemniscates Mn defined by |pn(z)| = 2 converge to the boundary of the Mandelbrot set.
The Mandelbrot curves are of degree 2n+1.

Notes

References
Alexandre Eremenko and Walter Hayman, On the length of lemniscates, Michigan Math. J., (1999),  46, no. 2, 409–415 
O. S. Kusnetzova and V. G. Tkachev, Length functions of lemniscates, Manuscripta Math., (2003), 112, 519–538 

Plane curves
Algebraic curves